Galehaut (or Galaha[l/u]t, Galeho[l]t, Gallehau[l]t, Galhault, Galetto, et al.) is a half-giant knight and sovereign prince in the Arthurian legend. He is most prominent within the Lancelot-Grail prose cycle where he is a noble enemy turned an ally of King Arthur as well as an inseparable friend (and possible lover, according to some interpretations of the early 13th-century "Lancelot propre", from the Vulgate Cycle) of Arthur's champion Lancelot. The figure of Galehaut should not be mistaken with Lancelot's son, Galahad (which is also Lancelot's own birth name), and some other similarly named characters.

Legend
Galehaut, lord of the Distant Isles (le sire des Isles Lointaines), appears for the first time in the Matter of Britain in the "Book of Galehaut" section of the early 13th-century Prose Lancelot Proper, the central work in the series of anonymous Old French prose romances collectively known as Lancelot-Grail (the Vulgate Cycle). An ambitious, towering figure of a man, he emerges from obscurity to challenge King Arthur for possession of Arthur's realm of Logres. Though unknown to Arthur and his court, Galehaut has already conquered lands and acquired considerable power, loyal followers, and a reputation for personal valor and noble character. Both the Vulgate Cycle and the Prose Tristan describe him as "the son of the Fair Giantess" (fils de la Bele Jaiande), given the name Bagotta in La Tavola Ritonda, and the evil human lord Brunor, both of whom are later killed by Tristan who takes over their castle in the Prose Tristan. Galehaut also has a sister, named Delice in the Prose Tristan and Riccarda in the Italian version I Due Tristani.

In the ensuing war, it becomes clear that Galehaut's army is going to win against Arthur's. However, Galehaut is so awed by the battlefield prowess of one of Arthur's knights, the mysterious Black Knight, that for his sake he renounces a certain victory and surrenders to Arthur for a chance to spend a night alone with the enigmatic hero. The knight, who turns out to be the young Lancelot, gratefully accepts Galehaut's companionship. What follows is a tale of Galehaut's love for Lancelot, interpreted by some modern scholars as a chivalric bond and deep male friendship and by others as explicit homosexuality, in which Galehaut figures as the central character as he becomes the tragic hero in the story. Galehaut, just as he has surrendered to Arthur, gives way before Guinevere, yielding Lancelot to her. He also joins Arthur's Knights of the Round Table, and later gives refuge to Lancelot and Guinevere in his land of Sorelois during the False Guinevere episode. He ultimately dies at the age of 39 by longing for Lancelot, having been separated with him (Lancelot was first kidnapped by Morgan le Fay and then went mad and disappeared) and after receiving false news of his death. Lancelot, at the end of his own life, is buried next to Galehaut at his castle of Joyous Gard in the tomb that he had built to consecrate and eternalise their companionship. Long after his death, Galehaut continues to be commonly recalled as an exemplar of greatness.

Since the early 13th century, there have been numerous retellings of the life, loves and chivalry of Lancelot's career and the story of his adulterous liaison with Queen Guinevere has always been part of every significant account of King Arthur. The second, overlapping love story, however, the one related in the Prose Lancelot, in which Galehaut sacrifices his power, his happiness, and ultimately his life for the sake of Lancelot, has been largely forgotten. The character himself reappears in a number of Arthurian tales, in several different languages, but without the same significance. The best known retelling in English, the 15th-century Le Morte d'Arthur of Thomas Malory, reduced him to just a relatively villainous minor "frenemy" of Lancelot, leaving Guinevere without a rival for Lancelot's affections, besides also relating a part of the Tristan side of the story in the part "The Book of Sir Tristrams de Lyons". Malory however gives a reminiscence of Galehaut's traditional role to a similarly named but different Knight of the Round Table named Galahodin, a character taken from Galehaut's son in law and successor, Galehodin from the Vulgate (in the Tavola Ritonda, Galehaut's heir is his son named Abastunagio). Malory furthermore created another of Lancelot's companions (and his own relative) similarly named Galyhod. In Italian romance Tristano Riccardiano, Galehaut dies of his wounds following a duel with Tristan in an attempt to avenge the slaying of his parents, forgiving him in the end.

Legacy
As Dante says in the fifth canto of Inferno, Galehaut was the book that Paolo and Francesca had been reading, when they yield to their love. Dante mentions Galehaut [Inf. V, 137] as both the book itself and the author of it, intermediary between Lancelot and the Queen. And Boccaccio, moved by the great lord's generosity, uses his name as the subtitle of his Decameron ("Il Principe Galeotto"). In Spanish, galeoto is still an archaic word for a pimp.

Subsequent novels, plays, poems, and films have accepted that simplification of the tale. Indeed, Galehaut has become so obscure that modern readers sometimes mistake the name for a mere variant of Galahad. Galahad is the "pure", the "chosen" knight who achieves the quest for the Holy Grail in a part of the Arthurian legend quite distinct from the story in which Galehaut appears. There is no connection between the two figures.

See also
Homosexuality in medieval Europe
Lancelot and the Lord of the Distant Isles, or the "Book of Galehaut" Retold

References

Further reading
 For an English translation of the "Book of Galehaut" within the Prose Lancelot, see vol. 2 of Norris J. Lacy et al., Lancelot-Grail: The Old French Arthurian Vulgate and Post-Vulgate in Translation, 5 vols. (New York-London: Garland [now Routledge], 1993–1996).
For the evolution of the personage of Galehaut in works subsequent to the Prose Lancelot, see "Translation and Eclipse: The Case of Galehaut" in The Medieval Translator 8, ed. R. Voaden et al. (Turnhout, Belgium: Brepols, 2003): 245–255.

Arthurian characters
Fictional bisexual males
Fictional half-giants
Fictional LGBT characters in literature
Fictional princes
Knights of the Round Table